State Nuclear Power Technology Corporation Limited (abbreviation SNPTC) is a Chinese state-owned enterprise in nuclear power. The company engages in the development of nuclear technology and is one of the country's three operators of nuclear power plants.

History
SNPTC was formally created in May 2007 by the State Council with the mandate to adopt 3rd generation nuclear technology from foreign suppliers and to implement and manage nuclear power projects. Before the 2015 merger of SNPTC with China Power Investment Corporation, the latter still retained the 10% stake. , the other minority shareholders were China National Nuclear Corporation (10%), China General Nuclear Power Group (10%) and CNTIC (4%).

In 2015 SNPTC was merged with fellow state-owned enterprise China Power Investment Corporation. More precisely, the controlling stake (66%) of SNPTC was transferred to China Power Investment Corporation from the State-owned Assets Supervision and Administration Commission of the State Council. The new name of the nuclear and conventional electricity producer was State Power Investment Corporation

In 2015, it was also announced that China Power New Energy Development, a listed subsidiary of State Power Investment Corporation, will take over State Nuclear Power Technology Corporation. More precisely, China Power New Energy Development signed a MoU to acquire by issuing new shares to SNPTC an/or another SPIC's subsidiary China Power New Energy Limited. and SNPTC to sell their nuclear power assets and businesses.

Nuclear power plants
The company has a joint venture that is constructing 4 nuclear reactors, two located in sites Sanmen and Haiyang, with all units commencing operations by 2016 or 2017.

Reactor designs

In September 2020, China's State Power Investment Corporation launched a design based on the Westinghouse AP1000 for more widespread deployment consideration. It was given the name Guohe One.

Footnotes

References

External links
  

Nuclear power companies of China
Nuclear technology companies of China
Government-owned companies of China
Companies based in Beijing
Energy companies established in 2007
2007 establishments in China